Sergey Vodopyanov (born 20 September 1987 in Taldykorgan, Kazakhstan) is a Russian amateur boxer best known for winning gold in the bantamweight class at the 2007 World Amateur Boxing Championships.

Career

2004 - 2006 
Vodopyanov won the silver medal at the 2004 Junior World Championships, where he lost to Hungarian Pál Bedák.

In 2006 he won the silver medal at flyweight at the Russian Championships, losing to three-times European champion Georgy Balakshin.

At the 2006 Junior World Championships he made an early exit against eventual champion Vasyl Lomachenko.

2007 
He won the 2007 Russian Championships in the bantamweight category against Zinat Zhandybayev, 27:25.

In Chicago at the 2007 World Amateur Boxing Championships the 20-year-old beat local hero Gary Russell Jr. 16:6 and Puerto Rican McJoe Arroyo 20:9 to reach the finals. There he edged out Mongolian Enkhbatyn Badar-Uugan 16:14.

2008 Beijing Olympics 
He was eliminated in the round of 16 in a 2008 Beijing Olympics bantamweight class fight by India's Akhil Kumar. The judges awarded the fight to Kumar with the scores tied 9-9 after four rounds, ruling that the Indian fighter had landed the most punches.

2012 London Olympics 
At the 2012 Summer Olympics, he again fought in the bantamweight class, and was again knocked out in the second round, beating Alberto Melian in the first round before losing to Robenilson de Jesus in the second.

References

1987 births
Living people
Bantamweight boxers
Boxers at the 2008 Summer Olympics
Boxers at the 2012 Summer Olympics
Olympic boxers of Russia
Russian male boxers
AIBA World Boxing Championships medalists
Universiade medalists in boxing
Universiade gold medalists for Russia
People from Taldykorgan
Medalists at the 2013 Summer Universiade